Theodore Davis may refer to:

Theodore Davis (Canadian politician) (c. 1778 – 1841)
Theodore M. Davis (1838–1915), American lawyer and archaeologist
Theodore R. Davis (1840–1894), American artist

See also
Ted Davis (disambiguation)